Peter Noel Barrington Sabine (born 21 September 1941) is a former cricketer who played first-class cricket for Oxford University in 1962 and 1963.

Born in Cookham Dean, Berkshire, Peter Sabine attended Marlborough College, where he captained the First XI and played at Lord's for Southern Schools and Combined Schools in 1960. Writing in Wisden, E. M. Wellings described him as a commendable stroke-maker who played "positive, aggressive cricket". He went up to Hertford College, Oxford, and played two matches for Oxford University in 1962 and 10 in 1963, when he was awarded his blue.
 
His highest score in first-class cricket was 56 against Surrey in 1963. His best bowling return with his leg-spin was 4 for 51 against Marylebone Cricket Club (MCC), also in 1963. Earlier in the season he had helped Oxford achieve their first first-class victory for two years when he made 50 not out and 42 and took 3 for 18 in the second innings against Nottinghamshire.

References

External links

1941 births
Living people
People educated at Marlborough College
Alumni of Hertford College, Oxford
English cricketers
Oxford University cricketers